Rhine Falls is a locality within the Snowy Monaro Regional Council, halfway between Wambrook and Dry Plain at an altitude of ; ranking as one of the highest-elevated localities in Australia. Likewise, snowfalls occur frequently from May through to September, and can occur at any time of the year.

The region is characterised by its vast, flat to gently undulating grazing land on the highest part of the Monaro; beginning at an altitude of approximately 800 metres along the eastern side of the Snowy Mountains Highway, soaring to 1,320 metres at the crest of the locality.

Rhine Falls had a school from March 1892 to December 1933, generally described as a "half-time" school, although full-time until 1904 and in 1910 and 1911.

References

Snowy Monaro Regional Council
Localities in New South Wales